Kamil Anvarovich Ibragimov (born 13 August 1993) is a Russian right-handed sabre fencer, two-time team European champion, and two-time team world champion.

Personal life
Ibragimov is the son of foil fencers Anvar Ibragimov and Olga Velichko and is of Tatar and Russian origin. He began fencing at the age of seven under the guidance of 1992 Olympic champion Aleksandr Shirshov, who remains his personal coach.

Career

Amongst seniors, he made his breakthrough during the 2012–13 season, when he climbed his first World Cup podium with a gold medal in the Glaive d'Asparoukh after defeating Romania's Tiberiu Dolniceanu in the final. That same year, he won the Junior World Championship in Poreč and the 2013 Summer Universiade in Kazan. At the World Championships in Budapest, he was eliminated in the second round by Max Hartung of Germany. In the team event, where Ibragimov stood as reserve, Russia won the gold medal after prevailing over Romania in the final. 

In the 2014 European Championships at Strasbourg, Ibragimov made his way to the semi-finals where he was stopped by team-mate Aleksey Yakimenko and came away with the bronze medal. In the team event, Russia met Italy in the final. The Italians gained a 5-hit lead after the 7th relay. Despite individual victories in the two last legs, Russia could not bridge the gap and were defeated 44–45. A month after, in the World Championships at Kazan, Ibragimov was defeated in the second round by Nicolas Limbach of Germany. The team event was Ibragimov's first time as a full member of the side. Russia met Germany in the semi-finals. Selected to close the match instead of captain Nikolay Kovalev, Ibragimov could not prevent Germany from winning 45–40. They met Hungary in the small final, but were defeated once again and came away with no medal.

In the 2014–15 season Ibragimov won the Trofeo Luxardo in Padova after seeing off Ukraine's Andriy Yagodka in the final.

Medal record

World Championship

European Championship

Grand Prix

World Cup

References

External links

 
  (archive)
  (archive)

1993 births
Living people
Martial artists from Moscow
Russian male sabre fencers
Universiade medalists in fencing
Universiade gold medalists for Russia
Medalists at the 2013 Summer Universiade
Fencers at the 2020 Summer Olympics
Olympic fencers of Russia
Volga Tatars
Tatar sportspeople
Tatar people of Russia